Castejón is a municipality in the province of Cuenca, Castile-La Mancha, Spain. The municipality has 43.62 km2 and a population of 158 inhabitants, according to the 2015 census (INE).

References 

Municipalities in the Province of Cuenca